Joe Kraemer (born June 21, 1971) is an American composer and conductor of film and television scores. He has worked with director Christopher McQuarrie several times -- The Way of the Gun (2000), Jack Reacher (2012), and Mission: Impossible – Rogue Nation (2015).

Biography
Kraemer was born in Buffalo, New York and raised in Albany, New York. His father and uncle were both musicians, and Kraemer began taking piano lessons at an early age. In high school he befriended an older boy named Scott Storm, who became a professional filmmaker. Kraemer's first film score was for a Super-8 film written and directed by Storm, called Chiming Hour. Kraemer, who also acted in the film, was 15 at the time. Storm later introduced Kraemer to filmmakers Bryan Singer and Christopher McQuarrie.

While attending Berklee College of Music in Boston, Kraemer decided he wanted to be a film composer. Through contacts such as Singer and McQuarrie, he was able to obtain work first as a sound (and occasionally music) editor, before eventually crossing over into television and film composing.

Kraemer's first feature film score was the 2000 film The Way of the Gun, a modern-day western written and directed by Oscar-winner Christopher McQuarrie. The film starred Benicio del Toro, Ryan Phillippe, and James Caan. Though the film performed poorly at the box office, it became something of a cult classic, and some industry insiders began to expect great things from Kraemer. 

Over the next few years, Kraemer scored music for the hit TV series Femme Fatales, the docudrama Emerald Cowboy (2003); in 2006 he teamed up with his old classmate Scott Storm for the low-budget crime thriller Ten 'til Noon, which won awards at the film festival level; and in 2008 he scored the direct-to-video thriller Joy Ride 2: Dead Ahead, written by J. J. Abrams.

In 2012, Kraemer got his chance, composing the score for the Tom Cruise action thriller Jack Reacher (directed by McQuarrie). His score was nominated in the Best Original Score - Feature Film category at the 2012 Hollywood Music In Media Awards.  His credits also include the 2014 film Dawn Patrol, starring Scott Eastwood.

Kraemer worked with McQuarrie and Cruise again when he scored the fifth film in the Mission: Impossible franchise, Mission: Impossible – Rogue Nation (2015).

Since 2015, Kraemer has been providing music and sound design to a number of audio plays released by Big Finish Productions. These include spin-offs for Doctor Who characters such as Madam Vastra, Missy and Rose Tyler, starring the original actors.

In 2016, Kraemer was commissioned by the Dallas Chamber Symphony to write new music for F.W. Murnau's Sunrise: A Song of Two Humans.

In 2017, Kraemer composed the score for the teen anthology series Creeped Out on CBBC.

Filmography

Film

Television

Audiobooks
Since 2015, Kraemer has been providing music and sound design to a number of audio plays released by Big Finish Productions. At first, these were mainly Doctor Who Monthly Adventures plays, but Kraemer has moved to work mainly on spin-offs from the main range.

Notes

References

External links
 
 Kraemer scores Jack Reacher
 Composer Joe Kraemer Delivers Classic Score for ‘Jack Reacher’
 Big Finish Productions with Joe Kraemer

1971 births
American classical composers
American film score composers
Living people
American television composers
20th-century American composers
21st-century American composers
Musicians from Buffalo, New York
Musicians from Albany, New York
Berklee College of Music alumni
American male classical composers
American male film score composers
Male television composers
Classical musicians from New York (state)
20th-century American male musicians
21st-century American male musicians